The common Madagascar skink (Madascincus melanopleura) is an extant species of skink, a lizard in the family Scincidae. The species is endemic to Madagascar.

References

Madascincus
Reptiles described in 1877
Reptiles of Madagascar
Endemic fauna of Madagascar
Taxa named by Albert Günther